= Imliya =

- village
- Location within Madhya Pradesh Location within India
- Coordinates: 23.3359366°N 77.4558554°E
- Country: India
- State: Madhya Pradesh
- District: Bhopal
- Tehsil: Huzur
- Elevation: 497 m (1,631 ft)

Population (2011)
  - Total: 1,685
- Time zone: UTC+5:30 (IST)
- ISO 3166 code: MP-IN
- 2011 census code: 482422

Imliya is a village in the Bhopal district of Madhya Pradesh, India. It is located in the Huzur tehsil and the Phanda block.

== Demographics ==
According to the 2011 census of India, Imliya has 329 households. The effective literacy rate (i.e. the literacy rate of population excluding children aged 6 and below) is 71.27%.

Demographics (2011 Census)
	Total	Male	Female
Population	1685	861	824
Children aged below 6 years	258	128	130
Scheduled caste	266	144	122
Scheduled tribe	6	4	2
Literates	1017	597	420
Workers (all)	816	490	326
Main workers (total)	787	478	309
Main workers: Cultivators	439	277	162
Main workers: Agricultural labourers	230	106	124
Main workers: Household industry workers	7	6	1
Main workers: Other	111	89	22
Marginal workers (total)	29	12	17
Marginal workers: Cultivators	10	4	6
Marginal workers: Agricultural labourers	13	5	8
Marginal workers: Household industry workers	0	0	0
Marginal workers: Others	6	3	3
Non-workers	869	371	498
